The Directorate-General for Border Police is part of the Bulgarian Ministry of the Interior that is responsible for maintaining border controls at the points of entry and security along the land, sea and riverine borders. It is one of the Ministry's five operational services (along with the Directorate-General for National Police, Directorate-General for Combating Organised Crime, Directorate-General for Fire Safety and Civil Protection and the Specialized Counter-Terrorism Force). The current director of the Border Police is Rositsa Dimitrova.

Organization

Directorate-General for Border Police - the central management authority of the agency, including headquarters services and specialised services, such as intelligence and international coordination departments and training establishments.
 Regional Directorate "Border Police" - Airports
 Central Departments
 4 Border Police Headquarters: Sofia Airport, Plovdiv Airport, Varna Airport, Burgas Airport, provides security to the Bulgarian international airports (Gorna Oryahovitsa Airport also holds an international airport certificate, but since there are no regular scheduled flights to that airport, its security is provided by a gendarmerie detachment).
 Regional Directorate "Border Police" - Ruse, guards the whole northern border with Romania, including the Bulgarian section of the Danube River and the land border section in Dobrudja.
 Central Departments
 7 Border Police Headquarters: Vidin, Kozloduy, Somovit, Svishtov, Ruse, Silistra and General Toshevo
 "Border Police Ships" Base - Vidin

 Regional Directorate "Border Police" - Burgas, guards the whole eastern sea border.
 Central Departments
 4 Border Police Headquarters: Kavarna, Varna, Burgas and Tsarevo
 "Border Police Ships" Base - Sozopol
 Regional Directorate "Border Police" - Elhovo, guards the border with Turkey.
 Central Departments
 5 Border Police Headquarters: Malko Tarnovo, Sredets, Bolyarovo, Elhovo and Svilengrad
 Regional Directorate "Border Police" - Smolyan, guards the border with Greece
 Central Departments
 9 Border Police Headquarters: Novo Selo, Ivaylovgrad, Krumovgrad, Momchilgrad, Zlatograd, Rudozem, Dospat, Gotse Delchev and Petrich 
 Regional Directorate "Border Police" - Kyustendil, guards the border with North Macedonia.
 Central Departments
 3 Border Police Headquarters: Zlatarevo, Blagoevgrad and Gyueshevo
 Regional Directorate "Border Police" - Dragoman, guards the border with Serbia.
 Central Departments
 6 Border Police Headquarters: Oltomantsi, Tran, Kalotina, Chiprovtsi, Belogradchik and Bregovo
 Specialised force "Aerial Surveillance", the helicopter squadron of the Border Police, flying 3 AgustaWestland AW109 and 1 AgustaWestland AW139.
 Central Departments
 Sofia (Aviation) Base, Bezmer (Aviation) Base

References

External links
Official website of the Directorate-General for Border Police

Law enforcement agencies of Bulgaria